Buffalo Creek is a  tributary of the Maury River in Rockbridge County in the U.S. state of Virginia.  It is part of the James River watershed.

See also
List of rivers of Virginia

References

USGS Hydrologic Unit Map - State of Virginia (1974)

Rivers of Virginia
Tributaries of the James River
Rivers of Rockbridge County, Virginia